Endoxyla eluta is a species of moth of the family Cossidae. It is found in Australia, where it has been recorded from Queensland.

References

Moths described in 1903
Endoxyla (moth)